Vyas Deo Sharma is a former Fijian politician of Indian descent. In the House of Representatives he represented the Vuda Indian Communal Constituency, one of 19 reserved for Indo-Fijians, from 2001 to 2006.

He won the seat for the Fiji Labour Party (FLP) in the parliamentary elections of 2001 with almost 80 percent of the vote, taking the seat from the incumbent Vinod Chandra Deo Maharaj who had been elected on the FLP ticket in 1999 but had subsequently defected to the New Labour Unity Party.

In 2003, Sharma was offered the portfolio of Minister for Veterans Affairs, together with 13 other FLP parliamentarians who were offered cabinet positions by the Prime Minister, Laisenia Qarase but the FLP refused to accept this offer.

A staunch supporter of FLP leader Mahendra Chaudhry, he publicly clashed with fellow-parliamentarian Felix Anthony and others who questioned Chaudhry's style of leadership. On 30 June 2006, Fiji Village revealed that he had filed a police complaint against Anthony for alleged verbal abuse at the Warwick Hotel in Sigatoka the day before.

References 

Fiji Labour Party politicians
Indian members of the House of Representatives (Fiji)
Fijian Hindus
Living people
Politicians from Lautoka
Year of birth missing (living people)